William Christmas may refer to:

 William Christmas (Kilmallock MP) (1734–1803), Irish politician, MP for Kilmallock 1776–1783
 William Christmas (Waterford MP) (1798–1867), Irish politician, Conservative Party MP for Waterford City
 Billy Christmas (William Cecil Christmas, 1879–1941), Canadian sportsman
 William Whitney Christmas (1895–1960), American aviation pioneer and designer of the Christmas Bullet aircraft
 William A. Christmas (died 1970), participant in the 1970 Marin County courthouse incident